Stanislav Strnad (17 December 1930 – 5 April 2012) was a Czech film director and screenwriter. He directed 12 films between 1960 and 1986. His 1975 film My Brother Has a Cute Brother was entered into the 9th Moscow International Film Festival where it won a Silver Prize. His 1977 film Do Be Quick was entered into the 10th Moscow International Film Festival.

Selected filmography
 My Brother Has a Cute Brother (1975)
 Do Be Quick (1977)

References

External links

1930 births
2012 deaths
Czech screenwriters
Male screenwriters
Film directors from Prague